The SR USA class are some ex-United States Army Transportation Corps S100 Class steam locomotives purchased and adapted by the Southern Railway (SR) after the end of the Second World War to replace the LSWR B4 class then working in Southampton Docks. SR staff nicknamed them "Yank Tanks".

Origins

The United States Army Transportation Corps built 382 S100 Class 0-6-0 tank engine for use in the Second World War. They were shipped to the British War Department in 1943, and stored awaiting the invasion of Mainland Europe. Most went overseas but some remained in store.

By 1946 the SR needed either to renew or replace the ageing B4, D1 and E1 class tanks used in Southampton Docks, but Eastleigh Works was not in a position to do so in a timely manner or at an economic price. The replacement locomotives would need to have a short wheelbase to negotiate the tight curves found in the dockyard, but be able to haul heavy goods trains as well as full-length passenger trains in the harbour area.
The railway’s Chief mechanical engineer, Oliver Bulleid therefore inspected the surplus War Department tank locomotives. The Hunslet Austerity 0-6-0ST locomotives stored at the Longmoor Military Railway proved to be unsuitable for dock work because of their  wheelbase and inside cylinders, and also many of the survivors were in poor condition. However, the S100s stored at Newbury Racecourse had a  wheelbase, outside cylinders and had hardly been used. Those available for sale had been built by the Vulcan Iron Works of Wilkes-Barre Pennsylvania and H. K. Porter, Inc, of Pittsburgh.

Bulleid therefore took Vulcan-built locomotive WD4236 on approval in May 1946 and tested it thoroughly over the next few months. When it was found to be suitable, this locomotive and a further thirteen were purchased in 1947 for £2500 each. Six of these had been built by Porter and the remainder by Vulcan. However, when it was discovered that there were differences in dimensions between the locomotives from different builders the SR exchanged its Porter built locomotives for Vulcans, but could only do so with five examples. The railway therefore accepted one Porter locomotive at a reduced price and purchased another to provide spare parts. Thus, the thirteen further locomotives entered traffic between April and November 1947 as soon as they had been adapted.

Construction and adaptation

Following purchase, members of the class were fitted with steam heating, vacuum ejectors, sliding cab windows, additional lamp irons and new cylinder drain cocks. Further modifications became necessary once the locomotives started to enter traffic, including large roof-top ventilators, British-style regulators (as built they had US-style pull-out ones), three rectangular cab-front lookout windows, extended coal bunkers, separate steam and vacuum brake controls and wooden tip-up seats. This meant that it took until November 1947 for the entire class to be ready for work. Radio-telephones were later installed on the footplate to improve communication on the vast network of sidings at Southampton.

The class was allocated the British Railways (BR) power classification 3F following nationalisation in 1948.

Numbering
The original locomotive carried the War Department number 4326, and the subsequent purchase were numbered between 1264 and 1284 and between 1952 and 1973. Thirteen of the locomotives were re-numbered in a single sequence from 61–73 by SR but 4326 retained its War Department number. The locomotive used for spares was not numbered. After 1948 they were renumbered 30061–30074 by BR. Six examples were transferred to departmental (non-revenue earning) use in 1962/3 and renumbered DS233–DS238.

Livery
During the Second World War they were painted USATC black with white numbering and lettering 'Transportation Dept.' on the tank sides.  Prior to nationalisation, the locomotives were painted in Southern black livery with 'Southern' in "Sunshine Yellow" lettering. The lettering on the tank sides was changed to 'British Railways' during 1948 as a transitional measure. Finally, the class was painted in BR Departmental Malachite livery, with BR crests on the water tank sides and numbers on the cab sides.

Operational details

For fifteen years the entire class was used for shunting and carriage and van heating in Southampton Docks. They performed well and were popular with the footplatemen, but the limited bunker capacity often necessitated the provision of relief engines for some of the longer duties. Two examples were fitted with extended bunkers to address this problem in 1959 and 1960, but a more ambitious plan to extend the frames and build larger bunkers was abandoned in 1960 due to the imminent dieselization of the docks. They also often suffered from overheated axleboxes which was less of a problem when shunting but prevented them from being used on longer journeys.

A more serious issue was the condition of the steel fireboxes originally fitted to the class which rusted and fatigued quickly. This was partly due to their construction under conditions of austerity, and the hard water present in the docks. This came to a head in 1951 when several had to be laid aside until new fireboxes could be constructed. Thereafter there were no further problems.

The class was replaced from their shunting duties at Southampton from 1962 by British Rail Class 07 diesel-electric shunters, when the first member of the class was withdrawn, but the remainder were still in fairly good condition. The survivors were used for informal departmental purposes such as providing steam heating at Southampton or shunting at Eastleigh Motive Power Depot, before the withdrawal.  30072 became the pilot locomotive at Guildford Motive Power Depot and continued to carry out this duty until the end of steam on the Southern in July 1967. Six examples were officially transferred to ‘departmental’ duties and renumbered. These went to Redbridge Sleeper Depot (DS233), Meldon Quarry (DS234), Lancing Carriage Works (DS235 and DS236), and Ashford wagon works (DS237 and DS238; where they were named Maunsell and Wainwright).

Nine examples remained in service until March 1967 and five of these survived until the end of steam on the Southern Region four months later. Two of these engines, 30065/DS237 and 30070/DS238, were sold to Woodham Brothers in South Wales in March of 1968. However, before they could make their journey, their bearings ran hot and were declared "unfit for travel" which lead to the two tank engines being dumped at Tonbridge. Five months later, they were taken to Rolvenden where they were purchased for preservation.

Stock list

Preservation 

Four British examples of the USA class have been preserved:

 30064 Bluebell Railway - (Previously preserved at the Bluebell railway but left in 2022 after being purchased by a private buyer with plans to restore to working order). 
 30065 Kent and East Sussex Railway - (Under overhaul)
 30070 Kent and East Sussex Railway - (Operational) Returned to service in December 2017 following overhaul and outshopped in Longmoor Military Railway Lined Blue as No. 300 Frank S. Ross.
 30072 Ribble Steam Railway - (Undergoing major boiler repairs)
Two JŽ class 62 locomotives built by the former Yugoslav Railways to foreign design have been acquired for use at the Shillingstone Railway Project and given British liveries. There are minor technical differences.
 *30075 (formerly 62-669 built 1960- (Undergoing overhaul)
 *30076 (formerly 62-521 built 1954- Stored).

In fiction
An engine of this class appears in the Thomas & Friends TV series as Rosie.

References

Further reading

External links

 Project 62 Project 62 - owners of 30075 and 30076
 USA 0-6-0T Southern E-Group
 SR USA Dock Tank SR "USA" class Dock Tank No.WD 1959 (BR 30064) Bluebell Railway

USA
USATC S100
0-6-0T locomotives
H. K. Porter locomotives
Vulcan Iron Works locomotives
Railway locomotives introduced in 1942
Standard gauge steam locomotives of Great Britain